Syed Asif Quadri (Urdu:   سيد آصف قادرى  ) (born 19 November 1936) was a tennis player from India. He was the number 1 in tennis in Hyderabad State and Mysore State and number 2 in all of India during the 1950s and early 1960s. He also represented India at the Wimbledon championships in 1954. He is also a noted businessman / entrepreneur of India.

Ancestry
Syed Asif Quadri was born in Hyderabad city on 19 November 1936. He is the son of the famous educationist / administrator Syed Ahmed Quadri and Mehrunnisa Begum.

His lineage traces back to the fourth Caliph Ali ibn Abi Talib. He was also a direct descendant of the famous Sufi Shaykh Abdul Qadir Gilani (1077–1166) and his great great grandfather was the Sufi shaykh of Tekmal Sayyid Sahib Husayni (1805–1880).

His ancestors migrated from Baghdad first to Allahabad in north India, and then shifted south to Tekmal adopting this town as their permanent native place.

Early life and education
Asif Quadri spent his childhood and teen years in Hyderabad city. His mother had returned to England when he was barely 13, and he was thus brought up primarily by his father Syed Ahmed Quadri, who became his constant mentor, guide and friend. His father groomed him in sports, and he excelled.

His schooling was at Madrasa-e-Aliya from where he passed out in 1952. He then joined Nizam College in Hyderabad, India and completed his BSc in mathematics, physics and chemistry in 1956.

At the end of 1956, Hyderabad State was disbanded by the Government of India and several of its districts were given to Maharashtra State, Mysore State and Madras State. The rump was reconstituted into Andhra Pradesh.

As a result, a number of officers of the government of Hyderabad were transferred to the other states. Asif Quadri's father Syed Ahmed Quadri was transferred to Mysore State as a part of this restructuring, and the family moved to Bangalore in the beginning of 1957.

Asif Quadri chose to become an engineer and joined the College of Engineering Bangalore that year. He graduated as an electrical engineer in 1961.

Achievements in Sports
Asif Quadri started his sports career very early, and was a member of the Madrasa-e-Aliya school cricket team from 1950 to 1952. During the same period he was also chosen to play cricket for the Hyderabad schools as well. He was considered to be a star batsman and contributed to numerous wins and records for his tem.

The first time Hyderabad team reached the final of Roushan Ara Tournament, he had the highest average along with a record partnership for the 8th wicket in the All India schools tournament. He then played for the Junior State team of Hyderabad for two years from 1954 to 56. Later on, he continued his cricket career when he played for Mysore University in 1959 and captained the Bangalore Engineering College team in 1960–61.

Asif Quadri's fame knew no bounds in tennis.  He was the No.1 tennis player of Hyderabad State in Juniors from 1951 to 1954, and No.1 in Seniors of the State in 1955–1956. As a Junior, he also won Northern India Singles and Doubles in 1953 and All India hard court Doubles 1954 by beating Ramnath Krishnan.

After his move to Mysore State at the end of 1956, he remained at the top in of the State from 1957 to 1961 as Mysore No.1. While he was always at the top in State tennis, he was also no. 2 in all of India next to Ramnath Krishnan. In 1954, he was chosen to represent India at the Wimbledon championship in the UK along with Ramnath Krishnan.

He chose not to become a professional tennis player, and thereafter phased out from national tennis.

In addition to tennis and cricket, he excelled in softball and golf as well.  He was also on the Mysore State softball team from 1958 to 1961.

Later on in life, he maintained his sportsmanship through golf championships. He won several golf tournaments in Hyderabad, India along with the Rais Jung Open Championship of Hyderabad, India in 1985. He was the runner up in a national tournament in 1984.

Much of the credit for his success in sports and his later professional career goes to his father Syed Ahmed Quadri who recognized his son's inherent ability and coached and guided him accordingly.

Professional Career and Business
Asif Quadri chose to become an engineer instead of a professional sportsman.  Soon after his graduation, he was offered a scholarship by AEG to specialize in switchgear at Stuttgart, Germany. In his excitement, he started to learn German language.

In the meantime, he was offered a job as a trainee in Standard Oil Company (Mobil) in 1962 and he opted for it while hoping to go to Germany. When he returned from his training, he found out to his dismay that his father had written to AEG declining to send him to Germany. He could feel that his father was not prepared to let him go away out of love, and he accepted this as such. In the meantime, his cousin Kazi Abdur Rasheed also arranged for him to proceed to the US to do his master's degree, but in deference to his father's wishes he remained behind in India to work with Standard Oil Company.

During 1962, Standard Oil was taken over by Esso Standard Eastern Inc. Asif Quadri was inducted into the sales department, and was posted at different cities of India including Hyderabad, India, Madras, Bombay, Calcutta, Indore, and Nagpur. He was also sent on deputation to England in 1969–1970 with ESSO Europe.

His last posting was in the position of Assistant Regional Manager overseeing sales and operations before he left ESSO in 1972.

Asif Quadri left his job with ESSO to enter into his own business. His first business venture was in the form of a petrol station / car wash / automotive repair shop at Hyderabad, India. With the success of this business he set up a transportation company in 1974 with a fleet of trucks. His focus was on the transport of sugar, coal and cement.

Both of these businesses have flourished over the past decades. In later years, his transport company became the prime transporter for Associated Cement Company which is the largest cement producer in India.

In subsequent years, his operations expanded further in automotive product sales. He became the dealer for Goodyear, Ceat, Dunlop and Mansfield tires in Hyderabad, India.

With the growth of his business empire, he decided to promote a 250,000 tons/year capacity cement plant in 1986 in Andhra Pradesh. He sold that venture in 1995.

His last major success was in real estate. In 1996, he moved with his wife to California, USA and started with his real estate business in the USA.

Upon his move to the US, he joined Century 21 All Realty. He then underwent training and obtained a real estate license in California. Subsequently, he invested in a number of apartment complexes in Los Angeles. He is now with The Real Estate Group in Torrance, California and continues to own, manage and sell real estate.

Family
Syed Asif Quadri was married first to the late Rizwana Begum, who bore him three children.

Later on, Asif Quadri married his cousin Malik Taj Qutub in 1986. His wife had been widowed one year earlier in 1985 and had three children from her first marriage. She expired in 2018.

See also
 List of Indians
 Sayyid Sahib Husayni
 Syed Ahmed Quadri

Footnotes

External links and reference books
 Muqaddas Tekmal, by Syed Azam Ali Sufi Qadri, Hyderabad, 1985
 A New Lease of Life to Tekmal, by Syed Ahmed Quadri, Hyderabad, 1982
 History of Takemal Dargah, by Syed Ahmed Quadri, Hyderabad, 1977
 Genealogy of Hyderabadi Families, by Kazi Zulkader Siddiqui, 2020

Indian people of Arab descent
Indian Muslims
1936 births
Indian male tennis players
Racket sportspeople from Hyderabad, India
Living people